Vladimir Petrovich Drachev (born 7 March 1966) is a former Soviet, Russian and Belarusian biathlete. He formerly had Russian citizenship and started for Russia until 2002. Drachev has four world championship titles in his career (two individually and two for teams). He also has two olympic relay medals for Russia (silver in 1994, and bronze in 1998). During his career he took a total of 11 World Championship medals and 15 World Cup race wins. He was also known as one of the fastest shots in the sport whilst competing.

Biathlon results
All results are sourced from the International Biathlon Union.

Olympic Games
2 medals (1 silver, 1 bronze)

*Pursuit was added as an event in 2002, with mass start being added in 2006.

World Championships
11 medals (4 gold, 5 silver, 2 bronze)

*During Olympic seasons competitions are only held for those events not included in the Olympic program.
**Team was removed as an event in 1998, and pursuit was added in 1997 with mass start being added in 1999 and the mixed relay in 2005.

Individual victories
15 victories (4 In, 8 Sp, 2 Pu, 1 MS)

*Results are from UIPMB and IBU races which include the Biathlon World Cup, Biathlon World Championships and the Winter Olympic Games.

After retirement
Head of Vsevolozhsky District of Leningrad Oblast since 2014. In 2016, he was elected to the State Duma representing the Yabloko party. In May 2018 Drachev was elected as President of the Russian Biathlon Union for a four-year term.

References

External links
 

1966 births
Living people
People from Petrozavodsk
Soviet male biathletes
Russian male biathletes
Belarusian male biathletes
Biathletes at the 1994 Winter Olympics
Biathletes at the 1998 Winter Olympics
Biathletes at the 2006 Winter Olympics
Olympic biathletes of Russia
Olympic biathletes of Belarus
Medalists at the 1994 Winter Olympics
Medalists at the 1998 Winter Olympics
Olympic medalists in biathlon
Olympic bronze medalists for Russia
Olympic silver medalists for Russia
Biathlon World Championships medalists
Holmenkollen Ski Festival winners
Seventh convocation members of the State Duma (Russian Federation)
United Russia politicians
21st-century Russian politicians